James Sykes (born November 7, 1954 in New Waverly, Texas) is a former Canadian football running back in the Canadian Football League for the Calgary Stampeders from 1977 through 1982, and for the Winnipeg Blue Bombers in 1983 and 1986.  He was an All-Star in 1978 and 1980.  He won the Eddie James Memorial Trophy in 1980 and 1981.

Career regular season rushing statistics

References

1954 births
Living people
American players of Canadian football
Canadian football running backs
Calgary Stampeders players
Winnipeg Blue Bombers players
Rice Owls football players
People from New Waverly, Texas